Edwin P. Deal (April 19, 1859 – December 10, 1945) was an American politician. He served as the State Treasurer of Missouri from 1913 to 1917.

References

Further reading

State treasurers of Missouri
Missouri Democrats
People from Charleston, Missouri
1859 births
1945 deaths